Rhyanna is a feminine given name of Welsh and Arabic origin.

Arabic name 

Rayhana or Reyhana (Arabic:رَيْحَانَة‎ rayḥānah), also spelt Rayhaana, Reyhaana, Rihana, Rihaana, is an Arabic female given name meaning the herb plant basil. However, the name may possibly derived from the noun rā’iḥāh (رائِحَة) meaning "scent, aroma, smell, odor" or "fragrance or perfume" or "zest of a fruit peel".

The name Rayhana is formed from male variant of the name is Rayhan.

It is said the woman is "Reyhana", that is not a qahramana, which is female slaves responsible in the harem during the Abbasid Period, but the qahramana is who is a woman employed to teach children in a private house - i.e. woman housekeeper, governess, or the manageress of the household and in charge of its affairs.

Welsh name 
The Welsh name is derived from the common female name, Rhiannon meaning great queen and most associated with Rhiannon, a semi-mythical Dark Age Welsh Queen (believed by some to be a Celtic goddess), prominent in Welsh texts such as the Mabinogi.

The Welsh names have gained popularity outside of Wales through their use in music and entertainment, especially the song "Rhiannon" by Fleetwood Mac and the Barbadian singer Rihanna.

See also 
Rhianna, given name
Riana § People with the given name Riana
Rhiannon (given name)
Jasmine (given name)

References

Feminine given names
Arabic feminine given names